Mercenaries is a video game franchise published by LucasArts and developed by Pandemic Studios. As of 2023, there are two Mercenaries games available.

Games 
Every game in the series is an action-adventure game and chronologically runs as follows: Mercenaries: Playground of Destruction, Mercenaries 2: World in Flames and Mercs Inc.

Mercenaries: Playground of Destruction (2005) 

After over 50 years of military tension, the aging President Choi Kim of North Korea began to embrace the "Sunshine Policy" of South Korea, reviving hopes of peaceful reunification; however, the North Korean military became disgruntled with the turn of events, fearing a dramatic loss of their power. Their leader, the brilliant and ruthless Choi Song, believed that his father, President Kim, was losing sight of "North Korea's true destiny." Song led an army of insurgents into a ceremony celebrating a road map to the reunification of Korea. Both North and South Korean political leaders were shot and killed, and Song himself shot his father dead without hesitation. This started a Second Korean War, which was won by an allied group of nations. However, Song and those loyal to him stage an insurrection as the various factions start to fall apart and the player character is called in to hunt down Song and his men during the chaos.

Mercenaries 2: World in Flames (2008) 

The game features three playable characters, all from the original game: Jennifer Mui, Mattias Nilsson and Chris Jacobs. All characters follow the same storyline that centers on the player's character of choice.

Mercs Inc (cancelled) 
Mercs Inc was a cancelled third game in the series developed by Danger Close Games. It was supposed to be the sequel to Playground of Destruction and World in Flames. It was a multiplayer third-person shooter.

The game was first rumored to be in development by Pandemic Studios as either Project X or Y which were rumored to be based on the Mercenaries franchise. Footage of the game was first leaked onto the internet on November 24, 2009, and was a multiplayer trailer of the game. The game was then officially announced by Electronic Arts less than a day later though without a proper platform or release date. The announcement of the game came less than a week after the closure of Pandemic Studios by Electronic Arts as it had been in development there under the name Project Y. The game was being developed by remaining Pandemic Studio staff members located at EA Los Angeles until the company was closed down in 2009.

Mercenaries 3: No Limits (cancelled) 
After Pandemic Studios shut down, a small demo was released. Despite this, EA has inexplicably continued to renew their ownership of the Mercenaries 3 website since 2007, as the website was renewed again on February 22, 2023, and set to expire on February 26, 2024.

Gameplay 
The player is deposited in a vast "sandbox" environment, free to pick up missions, perform side tasks, collect items, or employ game mechanics in exhibition. As the world is a sandbox, the player can choose to do any of these activities at any time. In fact, one can level all of the buildings in the game world, including the faction HQs. Buildings are usually restored after an extended time away from the area, the player's death, or re-loading the game. Also, the player can cause wanton destruction in many small outposts and strongholds occupied by and restricted to faction members only. However, excessive rampaging is discouraged by the reduction of the attacked faction's disposition towards the player, and the murders of civilians.

In order to get back in the favor of an offended faction, the mercenary must complete contracts for the faction. If the faction is so hostile that it refuses to give out contracts, the player must bribe the HQ guard first. There are other methods of increasing favor with a particular faction, even though they are less effective than the above two methods. For example, one can collect or destroy hidden items, such as National Treasures or Song's monuments, that are of interest to the faction. Also, when two factions are engaged in a skirmish, one can help a group of soldiers fight off the other group. Upon being witnessed, the player's actions will be favored by the faction receiving the help; however, the other faction will dislike the player more. A mercenary may disguise himself by driving in a faction's vehicle, as long as he is not seen getting in the vehicle by anyone in the vicinity. Inappropriate behavior, such as running over troops, results in the disguise being lost. With a hostile faction's vehicle, the player can infiltrate enemy outposts. However, faction officers can see through disguises, as well as sway their faction's disposition more strongly.

The player can perform various missions for different factions, but it is not required to complete every mission available. A mission involves one or multiple objectives that include stealing, delivery, retrieval, or destruction of certain items or vehicles, assassinating targets, and destruction of an enemy camp or stronghold. It is notable that a mission may upset another faction, such as when a Mafia mission requires the murder of a Chinese officer. The completion of a mission rewards the mercenary with cash, increase in the faction's disposition, and tips regarding the Deck of 52, and it occasionally unlocks items, vehicles, or airstrikes.

At any point in the game, the player is tasked with hunting down and "verifying" 13 targets of a "suit". "Verification" involves killing the target and taking a picture of the corpse, or subduing the target and summoning a helicopter to transport the prisoner. After every verification the player is awarded with "Intelligence" and cash, which is usually doubled if the target is captured alive. In a suit, the number cards (from 2 to 10) are located throughout the in-game region, and they can be found by exploration or by receiving tips from friendly factions. Each of the three face cards (Jack, Queen, King) is only made available by one of Chinese, South Korean, and Russian factions. A "face card mission" often involves specific objectives for the faction in addition to verifying the target. However, it is not necessary to verify all members of a suit to progress through the game. The player must gain enough Intelligence by verifying targets before the AN gives the player the Ace contract. The Ace, the most important figure in a suit, is located in an isolated, often heavily fortified, area where the player is dropped off. The Ace contract usually consists of a variety of required and optional objectives that can be accessed in multiple routes, before the ace is available for verification. After the ace is verified, the player is transported back to the main region to hunt down another suit of targets.

If the player attempts to leave the game world (leaving N. Korea), they will effectively enter a restricted area where either the AN Task Force or the North Koreans have supreme air power in those areas and entering these areas immediately prompts them with a warning message (either by an unnamed Allied radio operator or by your support operative, respectively) telling to get out now. If the player choose to ignore this warning, another message is transmitted telling that enemy planes are inbound. This is followed by three fighters appearing to shoot the player down with a large salvo of explosives that are impossible to completely dodge and tough to survive. These are areas that usually surround the province (with the exception of the Black Gate until after the Ace of Clubs is verified) and are marked in red.

Mercenaries 2 expands upon the original's third-person shooter gameplay through contracts and side missions using a large variety of weapons, vehicles, air support, and airstrikes. The game has approximately 170 types of vehicles; this includes monster trucks, bikes, heavy tanks, and helicopters. To complement the new swimming mechanic, new vehicles such as boats have been added. Hijacking still plays a large role in gameplay, but instead of being a fixed cinematic, now consists of a small minigame with difficulty relative to the value of the vehicle being hijacked. A grappling hook has been added to allow the player to hijack helicopters. The game has a large and diverse arsenal of weapons and airstrikes, including various sniper rifles and assault rifles, and a fuel-air RPG grenade that releases a cloud of fuel and ignites it. The game contains a number of air support and airstrike options, such as tactical nuclear weapons and the M.O.A.B.

Players have the ability to build a private military company and recruit mercenaries with it. There are three mercenary NPCs that may be recruited: Eva Navarro, a mechanic, who can supply custom vehicles and unlocks access to the grappling hook; Ewan Devlin, a helicopter pilot who has the ability to pick up valuable objects the player may encounter and also provide transport and extraction; and Misha Milanich, a fighter pilot, who can be hired as your source for airstrikes. Prior to use, support items have to be purchased from faction outposts, rewarded from missions, or found in the field, for Ewan to extract. Stockpiled vehicles, items, or weapons can then be called in from anywhere in the field.

The player can gain money between missions by killing or capturing various "high-value targets" for each of the factions. Additionally, "destruction" targets allow players to raze a building for rewards and to raise faction standings. All factions have both high-value targets and destruction targets available. Some of the high-value targets are members of another faction, so accosting them can possibly lower the player's standing with that faction.

The game includes numerous side missions that can be completed to increase the player's reputation with a faction and earn him or her extra cash. Similarly, some missions will harm the player's reputation with a faction. However, loss of reputation may be avoided by preventing the faction's soldiers from alerting the faction boss. This mechanic limits the pool of missions available to the player. In addition, each faction requests the help from the player to secure outposts for them. After capturing an outpost, the player can then revisit the outpost to purchase support items. Each outpost has a helipad so the player may fly directly to them once captured, so long as the players standing with the outpost's faction is neutral or higher.

The Xbox 360, PS3 and Windows versions of the game include a co-op mode that allows two players to play through the game together online from separate consoles, using a "drop-in, drop-out" system. Every mission and activity in the game can be completed in co-op. A half kilometer tether is present in the game to keep the players from straying too far away from one another.

Related media

Graphic novel 
 Brian Reed, Mercenaries Graphic Novel-Based on the hit videogame (Dynamite Entertainment, 2008).

Strategy guides 
 Stephen Stratton, Mercenaries: Prima Official Game Guide (Prima Games, 2005).
 Catherine Browne, Mercenaries 2: World in Flames: Official Game Guide (Prima Games, 2008).

References 

 
Video game franchises
Electronic Arts franchises
Video games adapted into comics
Video game franchises introduced in 2005